John Albert Ainley Jr. (July 24, 1938 – May 3, 2001) was an American newspaperman and politician.

From Park Rapids, Minnesota, Ainley served in the United States Army and received his bachelor's degree from  Bemidji State University in mass communications. He owned the Park Rapids Enterprise and then the Park Rapids Advertiser. He served in the Minnesota House of Representatives from 1979 to 1983 as a Republican. He died in Saint Paul, Minnesota.

Notes

1938 births
2001 deaths
People from Park Rapids, Minnesota
Bemidji State University alumni
Businesspeople from Minnesota
Republican Party members of the Minnesota House of Representatives
20th-century American politicians
20th-century American businesspeople